David Dyke may refer to:

David Hart Dyke, Royal Navy officer
Sir David William Hart Dyke, 10th Baronet (born 1955) of the Dyke baronets

See also
David Dykes (disambiguation)